"I Wish I Had a Girl" is a 1988 song by American musician Henry Lee Summer from his self-titled 1988 album Henry Lee Summer, which was released one year after signing with Epic Records. The song also has a BPM of 127 and plays in 4/4 time signature. The single became a major success on rock radio in the United States, reaching number one on the Billboard Mainstream Rock (chart). On the Billboard Hot 100, it peaked at number 20.

Music video
The song was accompanied by a music video featuring Summer walking and singing to women. However, the women leave him throughout the video. In the end he ends up with a woman.

Charts

References

1988 singles
Epic Records singles